

Gabon

Gambia

Georgia

Germany

Ghana

Gibraltar

Greece

Greenland

Grenada

Guadeloupe

Guam

Guatemala

Guernsey

Guinea

Guinea-Bissau

Guyana

Lists of country codes